Cosmiodiscus is an extinct genus of diatom.

References 

 Descriptions of new and rare diatoms. Series XX. RK Greville, Transactions of The Microscopical Society & Journal, 1866

External links 
 

  
 Cosmiodiscus at AlgaeBase
 Cosmiodiscus at the World Register of Marine Species (WoRMS)

†
Prehistoric SAR supergroup genera